This is a list of mosques in Sri Lanka.

There are approximately 840 mosques in the country and following is a list of some of the notable mosques that are currently operating.

See also
 Islam in Sri Lanka
 Lists of mosques

References

External links

 
Sri Lanka
Mosques